Hans Stergel (born 26 May 1943) is a retired Swedish ice hockey player. Stergel was part of the Djurgården Swedish champions' team of 1963.

References

Swedish ice hockey players
Djurgårdens IF Hockey players
1943 births
Living people